"Wild Child" is a song by the Japanese duo Moumoon. It is the 15th single (13th under Avex Trax) of the duo. It was released on May 2, 2012 in 3 different editions: CD+DVD, CD only and a Limited Anime Edition.

Composition
"Wild Child" and the B-side "Start It Now" were written by the member Yuka and produced by the member Kousuke Masaki.

Promotion
"Wild Child" is being used as ending theme song for the anime "Yu-Gi-Oh! Zexal". A Yu-Gi-Oh! Zexal edition of the single was released including a Yu-Gi-Oh! sticker. "Start It Now" was used as ending theme song for NHK's show "Aphrodite no Rashinban".

Track listing

Charts

Release history

References 

2012 singles
Japanese-language songs
2012 songs
Avex Trax singles